Upper Little River Township is one of thirteen townships in Harnett County, North Carolina, United States. The township had a population of 7,708 according to the 2000 census. It is a part of the Dunn Micropolitan Area, which is also a part of the greater Raleigh–Durham–Cary Combined Statistical Area (CSA) as defined by the United States Census Bureau.

Geographically, Upper Little River Township occupies  in western Harnett County and is the largest township in the county by land area.  There are no incorporated municipalities located in Upper Little River Township, however, there are several unincorporated communities located here, including the communities of Luart, Mamers, Ryes, and Seminole.  A large portion of Raven Rock State Park is also located here.

Townships in Harnett County, North Carolina
Townships in North Carolina